The Shumatuscacant River is an  river running through Abington and Whitman, Massachusetts. It forms part of the Taunton River Watershed.

The river arises in a wetland just west of Vineyard Road, Abington, and flows to Poor Meadow Brook in Hanson, which then flows southwest to Robbins Pond. From there, the Satucket River originates in Robbins Pond and meanders west to join the Matfield River in East Bridgewater, thence to the Taunton River. Island Grove Pond formed in the 1700s when a dam was built on the Shumatuscacant River.

References 

 Taunton River Watershed
 Massachusetts Year 2006 Integrated List of Waters

Taunton River watershed
Rivers of Plymouth County, Massachusetts
Whitman, Massachusetts
Abington, Massachusetts
Rivers of Massachusetts